Baissogyrus savilovi is an extinct species of fossil beetle in the family Gyrinidae, the only species in the genus Baissogyrus. It is named after the Baissa locality of the Early Cretaceous (Aptian)  Zaza Formation, in Buryatia, Russia, where it was found.

References

†
Fossil taxa described in 1973
†
Prehistoric beetle genera
Early Cretaceous insects